or KMS-4 is a reconnaissance satellite launched by North Korea on 7 February 2016.

The launch happened after North Korea conducted a nuclear test on 6 January and as the United Nations Security Council was deciding on sanctions to be placed on the country following the nuclear test. The launch was also timed to celebrate the 74th birthday of the late leader Kim Jong-il on February 16.

Pre-launch
On 2 February 2016, North Korea sent a notification to the International Maritime Organization stating that the country was going to launch a Kwangmyongsong earth observation satellite with a launch window of 8–25 February between 22:30 UTC and 03:30 UTC given. The notification also included the drop zones for the first stage, the payload fairing and the second stage of the rocket, which was similar to the areas designated for the launch of Kwangmyongsong-3 Unit 2.

On 6 February 2016, North Korea sent another notification to the International Maritime Organization stating that the launch window had been changed to 7–14 February.

Launch

The satellite was launched on 7 February 2016 at 00:30 UTC into roughly a sun-synchronous orbit well suited for an earth observation satellite, using an Unha launch vehicle at Sohae Space Centre in Cholsan County, North Phyongan Province. Regarded as sending a message to both neighboring China as well as the United States, the launch also took place on the eve of the Chinese New Year and the Super Bowl in United States.

It was initially claimed by U.S. officials that the satellite was "tumbling in orbit" and that no signals had yet been detected being transmitted from it. However, it was later reported the tumbling had been brought under control and the orbit stabilized. This indicates that the satellite has established communication with North Korea.

On February 22, Russian news agency TASS reported the statement by Colonel Andrei Kalyuta of Russia's National Space Monitoring Center that, based on the orbit of the satellite, it was in line with the declared purpose. Satellite tracker and astronomer for Leiden Observatory Marco Langbroek captured images of the satellite on February 28; on examining long exposure images, the satellite was either not tumbling or in a very slow tumble. This was also evident by the stability of the brightness of the Sun's reflection when the satellite passed the camera frame. Bob Christy of Zarya website shared results of observing orbital periods of the satellite, it indicated the satellite was not tumbling and was under control as controlled reduction in altitude of the orbit was detected. North Korea Tech, an affiliate of 38 North, reported on findings made by Langbroek and Christy. Harvard-Smithsonian Center for Astrophysics Jonathan Mcdowell concluded satellite was at least partially operational based on visual information and observation of the satellite's gravity boom being deployed.

Post-launch
North Korea registered the satellite with the United Nations Office for Outer Space Affairs on May 9.

In addition to claiming North Korea was planning a moon mission, Hyon Kwang-il, director of the scientific research department at NADA, said the satellite had completed 2,513 orbits and had transmitted 700 photographic images in the day following its launch. The satellite passes over North Korea four times a day and continues to transmit data. However, international experts, such as astrophysicist Jonathan McDowell, have not confirmed any transmissions from the satellite.

Reactions

The North Korean government organized a fireworks display on February 7, 2016, in commemoration of the launch.

South Korea, Japan, the United States and other countries have accused North Korea of testing a ballistic missile (Unha is the satellite launch version of Taepodong-2) capable of hitting the United States. However, some experts at the time believed North Korea was still a decade away from having the capability to successfully deliver a nuclear weapon by means of an intercontinental ballistic missile (ICBM), and the launch showed slow, but continuous, progress. The director of the U.S. Missile Defense Agency stated the launch was not a test of an intercontinental ballistic missile.

The launch was strongly condemned by the UN Security Council. It prompted South Korea and the United States to announce that they would explore the possibility of deploying Terminal High Altitude Area Defence (THAAD), an advanced missile defence system, in South Korea, which is strongly opposed by China and Russia.

See also

 2016 in spaceflight
 List of North Korean missile tests

References

External links
 Live time satellite tracking

Reconnaissance satellites
Space program of North Korea
Spacecraft launched in 2016
2016 in North Korea